Anbarivu is a 2022 Indian Tamil-language family drama film written and directed by Aswin Raam in his directorial debut and produced by Sathya Jyothi Films. The film stars Hiphop Tamizha Aadhi in his first dual role, Kashmira Pardeshi, and Shivani Rajashekar, with Napoleon, Vidharth, Sai Kumar, Asha Sharath,  and Arjai in supporting roles. The film's music and the score is composed by Hiphop Tamizha with cinematography handled by Madhesh Manickam and editing done by Pradeep E. Ragav. The film was released via Disney+ Hotstar on 7 January 2022.

Plot  
  
The movie begins with MLA Pasupathy being driven in a car through Arasapuram, and he tells his story. Aandiyaapuram and Arasapuram are two neighbouring villages in Madurai. Pasupathy used to work as a servant for Muniyandi, the main village head of Arasapuram. At that time, his best friend, Prakasham falls in love with Muniyandi's daughter Lakshmi, and they secretly get married. Muniyandi gets angry with Prakasham, but a councillor and Muniyandi's friend Jayaprakasam resolves the problem. Eventually, Lakshmi gets pregnant and gives birth to two twin sons, Anbazhagan and Arivuazhagan. However, Pasupathy becomes enraged that his friend Prakasham gets the MLA candidate posting but he doesn't, even though he has toiled so hard for Muniyandi. So Pasupathy comes up with a devious plan to split Prakasham and Muniyandi to cause a family feud. So one night, Prakasham decides to leave the town with one of his sons and Pasupathy helps him. Eventually, Pasupathy convinces Prakasham to leave the town, after Muniyandi and his men hacked Prakasham's relatives. Jayaprakasam finds out about Pasupathy's plan and slits his throat, killing him. The family feud turns into a feud between the two neighbouring villages. Muniyandi, who lost his respect and name, asked Lakshmi to vow to live only with him with her first born. Soon, Pasupathy becomes MLA.

24 years later, Muniyandi lives with Lakshmi and his grown-up grandson Anbazhagan "Anbu". Anbu gets into unnecessary fights, however he loves his mother and grandfather. Anbu always thinks of his father when he fights, since he hates his runaway father. Meanwhile, Arivu lives with his father and his best friend Yazhini in Canada. Arivu loves his father, and his father treats his son like he is only family. The district collector wants to organise the chariot-carnival for that year, in an effort to unite the two villages. This causes a disagreement for Muniyandi and the Aandiyaapuram people, especially Singaram. Later, Anbu gets angry at his mom because her past mistakes causes his grandfather's name gets tarnished and his peace disturbed. Singaram talks to Pasupathy and decides to burn the chariot. Singaram's plan to burn the chariot gets foiled by Anbu, and causes an issue for the villagers. Pasupathy gets slapped by Muniyandi when he says the law should do its duty. In Canada, Jeff, who dislikes Arivu, shames him as a village man. Arivu gets angry at his father. His father explains why he broke with his family. Arivu decides to fly to Madurai to meet his family.

Anbu gets injured during a fight and they switch places; Anbu stays in Canada with his father Prakasham and Arivu stays in Madurai with his relatives. Arivu decides to change into Anbu. 'Anbu' becomes emotional after seeing his grandfather and his mother. However, after an altercation with the bull Marudhu, his mother Lakshmi realises that 'Anbu' is actually Arivu. Lakshmi convinces Arivu to stay with him, just him, Anbu and her father. Arivu's grandfather Muniyandi also realies that 'Anbu' is Arivu when he does not engage in a fight at a temple, and scolds both his daughter and Arivu. For the sake of her father, Lakshmi sends Arivu away. Meanwhile, Anbu falls in love in Yazhini. Arivu builds a tent in the centre of the village. Muniyandi convinces Muniyandi to let a German company build an agriculture company, to give the villages work and a good salary. Dheena scolds him when he eats a meal at a function. Arivu also falls in love in Kayal. Singaram, still angry at Arivu and Muniyandi, wants to kill him.  

Anbu shames Prakasham to his friend Ruben, telling his father is a runaway, he tells that Prakasham ran away when he was 1.5 years old. Anbu calls Muniyandi from a phone booth and convinces his grandfather to teach him a lesson. So Muniyandi calls Pasupathy.
Later that night, Kayal professes her love for Arivu. Singaram intervenes, and his men beat up Arivu, until the bull Marudhu arrives scaring away the henchmen. Later Arivu convinces to sell the land by its crops, which angers Pasupathy, who was close to sealing the deal. Kayal takes Arivu to her household and introduces him to her family, and then shows her family to Prakasham via video call. The following day, Lakshmi meets with a lorry accident. Arivu explains how discrimination is not necessary, and Dheena apologises to Arivu. Arivu meets with Pasupathy to find that he is the mastermind behind the accident. Prakasham apologies to Anbu, after Anbu reveals that he had suffered a lot of pain and bullying because he did not have a father to protect him. Lakshmi reaches Kayal's house to speak an alliance but becomes angry when Kayal tells that Arivu should live with the in-laws. Dheena convinces Muniyandi and Pasupathy to hold the chariot festival in an effort to unite the two villages. 

At the chariot festival, Pasupathy shames Muniyandi and reveals that he killed his best friend and broke up his family to reach his dream of becoming MLA. Anbu and Singaram bury the hatchet, after Singaram got betrayed by his henchmen While sitting, Anbu talks sense to Muniyandi, and how they were deceived for 25 years. Pasupathy goes to award the German corporates, but the German tells that he is not the boss. Just then, Prakasham makes a grand entry into the village, with Lakshmi and Arivu and Pasupathy greets him with a garland. Prakasham tells how his son Arivu taught that a human becomes complete by returning to their roots, and Anbu taught him love, anger and brought him to a balance. Muniyandi forgives his son-in-law. Muniyandi talks about how he made mistakes but he has learnt from them. Arivu later reveals Pasupathy as the main villain behind the village dispute, and Pasupathy gets arrested by the CBI. The festival becomes a success with both villagers of Aandiyaapuram and Arasapuram jointly pulling the chariot.

Cast 

Hiphop Tamizha Aadhi in as Anbazhagan (Anbu) and Arivazhagan (Arivu)
Napoleon as Muniyandi, Anbu and Arivu's grandfather and Lakshmi's father
Vidharth as MLA Pasupathy
Sai Kumar as Prakasham, Anbu and Arivu's father and Lakshmi's husband
Asha Sharath as Lakshmi, Muniyandi's daughter, Prakasham's wife and Anbu and Arivu's mother
Kashmira Pardeshi as Kayal, Arivu's lover (voice dubbed by Raveena Ravi)
Shivani Rajashekar as Yazhini, Anbu's lover
Arjai as Singaram
Dheena as Dheena, Anbu's friend
Sanjeev as DSP Naresh Pandian
Mullai as Advocate Mullai
Sharath Ravi as Venkat, Pasupathi Assistant
G. Marimuthu as Sundaram, Kayal's father
Renuka as  Arivu's aunt
Jeeva Ravi as Collector of Madurai
Ratchasan Vinod Sagar as Doctor Nimmathi
 Aadukalam Naren as Jayaprakasam
 Rintu Ravi as Kayal's mother and Prakasham's sister
 Niranjan Babu as Villager

Soundtrack 
The soundtrack and film's score were composed by Hiphop Tamizha, while lyrics were written by Vivek, Yaazhi Dragon, Hip-hop Tamizha and Thamarai. The first single "Arakkiyae" was released  on 22 December 2021. Another single "Ready Steady Go" was released on 27 December 2021. The third single "Kanavugal" was released on 1 January 2022. The last single "Kalangathey" was released on 5 January 2022. The audio rights were acquired by Lahari Music and T-Series.

S.P.Charan had sung another version of Thanga Sela song which is part of the film and Hiphop Tamizha had sung another version of Ready Steady Go song which is part of the film.

Release 
Due to the COVID-19 pandemic in India, Anbarivu skipped a theatrical release and opted for a direct-to-streaming release via Disney+ Hotstar on 7 January 2022, a week before Pongal day.

Reception
The film directly digital Primer in Disney + hotstar . Janani K critic from India today  gave 2 stars out of 5 stars and noted that "  If only the film delved deep into the actual issue, the film would have been much better." M Suganth from Times of india gave mixture of review " good Cast Salvages This Predictable Drama " gav e 2.5 stars out of 5 stars .Critic from Firstpost gave moxture of review "Hiphop Tamizha's 'family Entertainer' Lacks Novelty With Its Narrative" gave 1.5 stars out of 5 stars. Sudhir Srinivasan from Cinema express gave 1.5 stars out of 5 and said that " An Exhausting Film Punctuated by Bad Writing and Craft"

References

External links 
 

2020s masala films
2022 directorial debut films
2022 drama films
2022 films
Indian drama films